Margaret Storey (born 27 June 1926) is an author of books for children and young adults published by Faber.

She attended Girton College in Cambridge in 1948 to gain a BA Honours degree in English, and thereafter worked as an English teacher.

Neil Gaiman has cited her as an influence: "Margaret Storey is more or less out of print these days, alas. I loved her when I was about seven or eight, and am looking forward to finding out how much of her stuff has wound up in mine."

Her work includes a fantasy series based on the adventures of two children, Timothy and Ellen, and a witch named Melinda Farbright: "the real thing - strange and magical, and above all, dangerous"

Timothy and Two Witches (1966) - Illustrated by Charles W. Stewart
The Stone Wizard aka "The Stone Sorcerer" (1967) - Illustrated by Charles W. Stewart
The Dragon's Sister and Timothy Travels (1967) - Illustrated by Charles W. Stewart
A Quarrel of Witches (1970 - Illustrated by Doreen Roberts
The Sleeping Witch (1971) - Illustrated by Janina Ede
A War of Wizards (1976) - Illustrated by Janina Ede
The Double Wizard (1979) - Illustrated by June Jackson

She also wrote:
Pauline (1965)
Wrong Gear (1973)
Keep Running (1974)
Kate And The Family Tree (1965) - illustrated by Shirley Hughes
The Smallest Doll (1966) - illustrated by Shirley Hughes
The Smallest Bridesmaid (1966) - illustrated by Shirley Hughes
The Mollyday Holiday (1971) - Illustrated by Janina Ede

Pauline, about an orphan forced to live with uncomprehending relatives, has been described as "an astonishingly mature novel for a new writer".

She should not be confused with the mystery writer Margaret Storey, who has written a number of books, sometimes under the pseudonym Elizabeth Eyre with the author Jill Staynes.

References

 

Living people
English children's writers 
Place of birth missing (living people)
English women writers
1926 births